Jeffrey Glen Giauque is an American diplomat.

Biography 
Giauque was born in Utah and went to Olympus High. He attained a Bachelors of Arts in history and French from the University of Utah and received an Master of Arts and PhD from Ohio State University in European international history and the history of American foreign relations. He wrote his doctoral dissertation on the European Economic Community in 1999.

Giauque taught international relations and European history at Miami University (of Ohio).

Following September 11th attacks, Giauque would take a job in the United States' embassy in Croatia, ultimately working as vice consul.

In July 2020, Giauque was made Chargé d’Affaires at the United States' Embassy in Belarus. While serving he stressed that the United States supported the development and expansion of the Belarus High Technologies Park. He also would meet with officials from the New Life Church, a Full Gospel community that was evicted by authorities, describing their situation as an infringement on religious freedom.

Personal life 
Giauque is a husband, father, and a lover of cycling and American football.

Publications 

 Grand Designs and Visions of Unity: The Atlantic Powers and the Reorganization of Western Europe, 1955-1963 (Chapel Hill: University of North Carolina Press, 2002)

References 

Living people
Academics from Utah
University of Utah alumni
Ohio State University alumni
Miami University faculty
21st-century American diplomats
Ambassadors of the United States to Belarus
Year of birth missing (living people)